İkipınar can refer to:

 İkipınar, Çubuk
 İkipınar, İskilip